The Mercedes-Benz M143 engine is a naturally-aspirated, 2.2-liter, straight-6, internal combustion piston engine, designed, developed and produced by Mercedes-Benz; between 1936 and 1941.

Applications
Mercedes-Benz W143

References

Mercedes-Benz engines
Straight-six engines
Engines by model
Gasoline engines by model